is a Japanese football referee. She primarily served as an assistant referee and officiated in 117 international matches, including several editions of the FIFA Women's World Cup and the AFC Women's Asian Cup. She earned her first referee qualification from the Japan Football Association in 1988 and was registered as an international women's football referee in 1995. She won the AFC Assistant Referee of the Year Award in 2000 and received the AFC Distinguished Service Award Bronze Star in 2007.

References

Living people
1966 births
Japanese football referees
Association football people from Tokyo
FIFA Women's World Cup referees
Women association football referees